Shelby Smith (August 8, 1927 – November 6, 2020) was an American former politician. He was the 39th Lieutenant Governor of Kansas from 1975 to 1979. He attended the University of Kansas and served in the United States Navy in World War II and the Korean War. Smith died on November 6, 2020.

References

1927 births
2020 deaths
Kansas Republicans
University of Kansas alumni
Lieutenant Governors of Kansas
United States Navy personnel of World War II
United States Navy personnel of the Korean War